María Socorro Valenzuela-Vidanes, popularly known as Cory Vidanes  (born May 15, 1962), is a Filipina executive and Chief Operating Officer for Broadcast of ABS-CBN Corporation, the largest media conglomerate in the Philippines.

Personal life 
Vidanes first attended Assumption Antipolo and later Ateneo de Manila University, where she obtained her Bachelor of Arts degree in Communications.

Vidanes was married to Bobet Vidanes, a Filipino television director. And has three children, Ara, Kobi, and Chad.

Career 
In 1982, Vidanes started her broadcast career for the Banahaw Broadcasting Corporation (BBC-2) as a production assistant for the shows Big Ike's Happening and Vilma in Person (VIP). She started working with ABS-CBN when the network reopened in 1986 as an associate producer. She also served as a managing director for ABS-CBN TV productions from 2001 to 2009. She was responsible for the conceptualization, production and management of all TV entertainment programs on ABS-CBN Channel 2. She was appointed Head of Channel 2 Mega Manila Management for ABS-CBN effective 2009 after Charo Santos-Concio was promoted to president and COO of the company.

Vidanes was appointed as chief operating officer for broadcast of ABS-CBN effective February 1, 2016. This happened one month after the appointment of Carlo Katigbak as the network's new president and CEO.

Under her position as COO of Broadcast, she also manages the development of new concepts for ABS-CBN Channel 2 and ABS-CBN TVplus channels Yey, CineMo and Knowledge Channel, together with ABS-CBN CCO Charo Santos-Concio.

References

External links 
 

Living people
ABS-CBN executives
1962 births
Ateneo de Manila University alumni